Sheikh Russel KC is a professional football club based in Dhaka, Bangladesh, currently playing in the Bangladesh Premier League. The club has won the Federation Cup in 2012, which was their first major title. They also won their maiden Bangladesh Premier League title in the season 2012–13. Sayem Sobhan Anvir, managing director of Bashundhara Group, is the chairman of Sheikh Russel KC.

History

Emergence
Sheikh Russel Krira Chakra was established in 1995 and named after Sheikh Russel, son of former President of Bangladesh Sheikh Mujibur Rahman. The founder was Shahjahan Kabir, and striker Shofiqur Rahman Titu was appointed as the teams first ever captain in 1996. The club started its journey in 1996 with the Pioneer Football League. Then in 1998 the team became runners-up in the Dhaka Third Division and were promoted to the Dhaka Second Division, under the coaching of Wazed Gazi.

In 2002, Sheikh Russel KC became runners-up in the Dhaka First Division (second Tier). In their first appearance in top-flight football in 2003–04 season, Sheikh Russel stunned traditional powerhouses like Abahani, Mohammedan and Muktijoddha Sangsad to finish second in the top-tier at the time, the Premier Division Football League. Since then, despite playing in the country's first professional top-tier league, the Bangladesh Premier League regularly, Sheikh Russel did not get the expected success until the start of the next decade.

Treble win and drought 
In the 2012–13 season, Sheikh Russel KC got its highest success by winning the domestic treble, under the guidance of local coach Maruful Haque. Sheikh Russel defeated Sheikh Jamal DC 2–1 in extra time of the Federation Cup final to win a title for the first time its history. They then went on to win the 2013 Independence Cup final, 3–2 against Sheikh Jamal. They completed the treble by again edging Sheikh Jamal DC, this time to the 2012–13 Bangladesh Premier League. The team captained by goalkeeper Biplob Bhattacharjee, only conceded 14 goals in league, while Haitian playmaker Sony Norde, was the lethal, scoring 16 league goals.

Since their treble winning season, the club has failed to win another trophy finishing runners-up in multiple tournaments and were also knocked out of the AFC Cup qualifiers twice. They were also defeated by Mohammedan SC in the 2013 Super Cup final. However, the team did manage to reach the semi-finals of the 2014 AFC President's Cup.

On 9 January 2015, the managing director of Bashundhara Group, Sayem Sobhan Anvir was appointed as the club's new chairman. He assured that the club would be back challenging for titles once more. However, the clubs further investment all went in vain as they failed to produce results on the pitch the following seasons.

On 20 April 2017, Sheikh Russel KC were fined 2000 Swiss Francs by FIFA over contract disputes with a player and a coach.

Attempt to rebuild
In October 2018, veteran coach Saiful Bari Titu was appointed as the clubs head coach. In 2020,  Sheikh Russel were one of the four clubs from Bangladesh to attain AFC Cup licensing. Russel spent heavily the next three years signing several national team players alongside expensive foreign recruits, however, the club found themselves fighting for relegation, leading to Titu's dismissal after three and a half years of service to the club, in March 2022.

Current squad
Sheikh Russel KC squad for 2022–23 season.

Coaching staff

Management

Board of Directors

As of March 2022.

Team records

Head coach's record

Kit manufacturers and shirt sponsors

Honours

Winners
  Bangladesh Premier League:
2012–13
  Federation Cup:
2012
  Independence Cup:
2012–13

Runners-up
  Bangladesh Premier League:
 2014–15
  Dhaka Premier Division League:
 2003–04 
  Dhaka First Division League:
 2002
  Super Cup
 2012–13
  Independence Cup (2):
 2011, 2018–19

Performance in AFC competitions

Affiliated clubs 
The following club is currently affiliated with Sheikh Russel KC:
  East Bengal Club (2022–present)

References

External links
 Sheikh Russel FIFA page

Sheikh Russel KC
Football clubs in Bangladesh
1995 establishments in Bangladesh